In the Russian Federation, a state secret (Gosudarstvennaya Tayna), according to the definition adopted in the Official Secrets Act of the Russian Federation, is information protected by the state on its military, foreign policy, economic, intelligence, counterintelligence, operational and investigative and other activities, dissemination of which could harm state security.

Protection of State Secrets in the Russian Federation
Legislation of the Russian Federation on State Secrets was based on the Constitution of the Russian Federation, Federal Law "On Security" and "On State Secrets".
The list of information constituting state secrets shall be determined by federal law   "On State Secrets" (Section II), under which inter-ministerial Commission for the Protection of State Secrets generates a list of information classified as state secrets.

Public authorities, whose leaders have the authority to designate information as state secrets, develop, within their competence, detailed lists of information to be classified. Guided by these lists, originators determine the degree of secrecy of information, establish the secrecy of documents developed by them (carriers) and their restrictive measures.

Under the law "On State Secrets" it is forbidden to designate as state secrets and classify information:
 on emergencies and disasters that threaten the safety and health of citizens, and their consequences, as well as natural disasters, their official forecasts and consequences;
 state environment, health, sanitation, demography, education, culture, agriculture, and the state of crime;
 on privileges, compensations and social safeguards provided by the state to citizens, officials, enterprises, institutions and organizations;
 about violations of human rights and freedoms of man and citizen;
 on the amount of gold reserves and government foreign exchange reserves of the Russian Federation;
 on the health status of senior officials of the Russian Federation;
 on any violations of law by public authorities and their officials.

For most of the 20th century, classification in Russia included topographic maps that are fully unclassified in most other countries. After the collapse of the Soviet Union, maps of scale 1:100,000 and less were declassified, but larger scale maps were still considered a state secret. This caused a number of problems for GIS and navigation software makers, and many foreign tourists relied on war time maps prepared by the Germans (e.g. Caucasus area).  Around 2010, the declassification process for maps of larger scale (up to 1:50,000) was started.

Levels of secrecy
Levels of secrecy of documents in the USSR, and still in Russian Federation, from maximum to minimum are:
ОВ (Совершенно секретно/особой важности or simply Особой важности) en.:Particularly Important, equivalent in US: TOP SECRET
СС (Совершенно секретно) en.:Completely Secret, equivalent in US: SECRET
С (Секретно) en.:Secret, equivalent in US: CONFIDENTIAL
Limited access (potentially sensitive), but unclassified information
ДСП (Для служебного пользования) en.: For Official Use Only, equivalent in US: FOR OFFICIAL USE ONLY (FOUO) or RESTRICTED
ДСП do not belong to the state secret.

Classified documents with special contents are marked:
Особая папка en.: Special Folder, no equivalent in US 
Литер "К" (used for mobilization documents), en.: Type K, no equivalent in US
Лично en.: Personal, equivalent in US: PERSONAL

The degree of secrecy of information constituting state secrets, is consistent severity of damage, which may be caused by the public spread said information. Using secrecy levels for classifying information that is not classified as state secrets is not allowed.

Declassification of information
The grounds for the declassification of information classified as state secrets (i.e. removal of restrictions on their distribution) are:
 compliance with the Russian Federation's international obligations under the open exchange of information constituting a state secret of the Russian Federation;
 change of objective circumstances, which result in further protection of information constituting a state secret being inappropriate.
The term of classification of information constituting state secrets, shall not exceed 30 years. In exceptional cases this period may be extended at the conclusion of the interdepartmental commission on protecting state secrets.

Limitations
Persons admitted to the degree of information "Top Secret" or "special importance", may be limited in their constitutional rights. Such restrictions may be placed only on an individual basis by the security organs on the basis of conclusions about the awareness of individuals in the information constituting a state secret.

Officials admitted to state secrets to the Russian Federation
List of positions, the substitution of which persons are admitted to the state secret, approved by Decree of the President of the Russian Federation on January 15, 2010 № 24-p
Prime Minister of Russia
Attorney General of the Russian Federation
Head of Presidential Administration
Secretary of Russian Security Council
First Deputy Prime Minister
Deputy Prime Minister
Deputy Prime Minister – Minister of Finance of the Russian Federation
Deputy Prime Minister – Chief of Staff of the Russian Federation
First Deputy Prosecutor General of the Russian Federation – Chairman of the Investigative Committee of the Procuracy of the Russian Federation
Federal Minister
Chairman of the Central Election Commission of the Russian Federation
Chairman of the Accounting Chamber of Russian Federation
Chairman of the Central Bank of Russian Federation
President of the Russian Academy of Sciences
Head (Director) of the Federal Service
Head (Director) of the federal agency
Senior official (head of the supreme executive organ of state power) of the Russian Federation
Commissioner for Human Rights in the Russian Federation
Head of organization with in accordance with federal law the authority to exercise on behalf of the Russian Federation government in the specified area of activity

Officials with the right information, to designate state secrets to the Russian Federation

1994–1997
Order of the President of the Russian Federation from February 11, 1994 № 73-p "approved list of officials of public authorities, vested with authority to refer information to the state secret:
 Russian Federation Minister of Atomic Energy
 Minister of the Russian Federation for Civil Defence, Emergencies and Elimination of Consequences of Natural Disasters
 Minister for Foreign Economic Relations of the Russian Federation
 Minister of Internal Affairs of the Russian Federation
 Minister of Health and Medical Industry of the Russian Federation
 Minister for Foreign Affairs of the Russian Federation
 Minister of Science and Technology Policy of the Russian Federation
 Minister of Defence of the Russian Federation
 Minister of Environment and Natural Resources of the Russian Federation
 Minister of Transport of the Russian Federation
 Minister of Communications of the Russian Federation
 Minister of Agriculture and Food of the Russian Federation
 Minister of Fuel and Energy of the Russian Federation
 Minister of Transport of the Russian Federation
 Minister of Finance of the Russian Federation
 Minister of Economy of the Russian Federation
 Chairman of the State Committee of Russia
 Chairman Goskomproma Russia
 Chairman of the State Committee Russia
 Chairman of Russian State Customs Committee
 Chairman Roskomnedr
 Chairman Roskomrezerva
 Chairman Roskomdragmeta
 Chairman of the Committee under the President of the Russian Federation for Information Policy
 Chairman Roskommasha
 Chairman Rosskommetallurgiya
 Chairman of Russian State Standard
 Chairman Roskomhimnefteproma
 Head Roscartography
 Director of the FGC Russia
 Director of the SVR of Russia
 The Director-General FAPSI
 Director of the Tax Police Department of the Russian Federation
 RSA Director General
 Chairman of the State Technical Commission of Russia
 Head Guo Russia
 Head of the Presidential Security Service of the Russian Federation
 Chairman of the Bank of Russia
 Commander of Border Troops of the Russian Federation (on the order of the President of the Russian Federation dated 27 June 1994 ? 331-p)
 The head of Hydromet (including the disposition of the President of the Russian Federation dated 27 June 1994 ? 331-p)
 Head of the Main Directorate of Special Programs of the President of the Russian Federation (on the order of the President of the Russian Federation on October 24, 1994 ? 537-rp)
 Head of Presidential Administration of Russian Federation (including the disposition of the President of the Russian Federation on June 6, 1996 ? 290-rp)
 Minister of Construction of Russian Federation (including the disposition of the President of the Russian Federation dated 21 June 1996 ? 333-rp)
 Chairman GKVTP Russia (including the order of the President of the Russian Federation dated 21 June 1996 ? 333-rp)

1997–2000
Order of the President of the Russian Federation from May 30, 1997 № 226-rp approved list of officials of public authorities, vested with authority to refer information to the state secret:

 Russian Federation Minister of Atomic Energy
 Minister of Foreign Economic Relations and Trade of the Russian Federation (Decree of the President of 23 July 1998 removed it from the list)
 Minister of Internal Affairs of the Russian Federation
 Minister of the Russian Federation for Civil Defence, Emergencies and Elimination of Consequences of Natural Disasters
 Minister of Health of the Russian Federation
 Minister of the Russian Federation on Land Policy, Construction and Housing and Communal Services (including the disposition of the President of the Russian Federation of 23 July 1998 ? 280-rp, expelled the order of the President of the Russian Federation of January 23, 1999 ? 12-p)
 Minister for Foreign Affairs of the Russian Federation
 Minister of Science and Technology of the Russian Federation
 Minister of Education of the Russian Federation
 Minister of Defence of the Russian Federation
 Minister of Natural Resources of the Russian Federation
 Minister of Industry and Trade of the Russian Federation (including the disposition of the President of the Russian Federation of 23 July 1998 ? 280-rp, expelled the order of the President of the Russian Federation of January 23, 1999 ? 12-p)
 Minister of Transport of the Russian Federation
 Minister of Agriculture and Food of the Russian Federation
 Minister of Fuel and Energy of the Russian Federation
 Minister of Trade of the Russian Federation (including the disposition of the President of the Russian Federation of January 23, 1999 ? 12-p)
 Minister of Transport of the Russian Federation
 Minister of Finance of the Russian Federation
 Minister of Economy of the Russian Federation
 Minister of Justice of the Russian Federation (including the disposition of the President of the Russian Federation of January 23, 1999 ? 12-p)
 Chairman of the State Committee of Russia (ruled out the order of the President of the Russian Federation of 23 July 1998 ? 280-p, re-inserted in order of the President of the Russian Federation on January 23, 1999 ? 12-p)
 Chairman Goskomrezerv Russia
 Chairman of the State Construction Committee of Russia (ruled out the order of the President of the Russian Federation of 23 July 1998 ? 280-p, re-inserted in order of the President of the Russian Federation on January 23, 1999 ? 12-p)
 Chairman of the State Committee of Russia
 Chairman of the State Committee of Russia
 Chairman of Russian State Standard (deleted order of the President of the Russian Federation dated 23 July 1998 ? 280-p, re-inserted in order of the President of the Russian Federation on January 23, 1999 ? 12-p)
 Chairman of Russian State Customs Committee
 Director of Russian Federal Border Guard Service
 Russian FSB director
 Director of the SVR of Russia
 Head Roscartography (deleted order of the President of the Russian Federation dated 23 July 1998 ? 280-p, re-inserted in order of the President of the Russian Federation on January 23, 1999 ? 12-p)
 Director of the Russian Tax Police
 The head of Hydromet (deleted order of the President of the Russian Federation dated 23 July 1998 ? 280-p, re-inserted in order of the President of the Russian Federation on January 23, 1999 ? 12-p)
 Head of Russian Federal Security Service
 RSA Director General
 The Director-General FAPSI
 Head of Presidential Administration
 Head of the Main Directorate of Special Programs of the President of the Russian Federation
 Chairman of the State Technical Commission of Russia

2000–2005
Order of the President of the Russian Federation from January 17, 2000 № 6-pn approved list of officials of public authorities, vested with authority to refer information to the state secret:

 Russian Federation Minister of Atomic Energy
 Minister of Internal Affairs of the Russian Federation
 Minister of the Russian Federation for Civil Defence, Emergencies and Elimination of Consequences of Natural Disasters
 Minister of Health of the Russian Federation
 Minister for Foreign Affairs of the Russian Federation
 Minister of Science and Technology of the Russian Federation (deleted Decree of President of Russian Federation from September 26, 2000 ? 419-rp)
 Minister of Defence of the Russian Federation
 Minister of Education of the Russian Federation
 Minister of Natural Resources of the Russian Federation
 Minister for Industry, Science and Technology of the Russian Federation (including the disposition of the President of the Russian Federation of 26 September 2000 ? 419-rp)
 Minister of Transport of the Russian Federation
 Minister of the Russian Federation for Communications and Informatization
 Minister of Agriculture of the Russian Federation (including the disposition of the President of the Russian Federation dated 26 September 2000 ? 419-rp)
 Minister of Agriculture and Food of the Russian Federation (Decree of the President removed the Russian Federation of 26 September 2000 ? 419-rp)
 Minister of Fuel and Energy of the Russian Federation (deleted Decree of President of Russian Federation from September 26, 2000 ? 419-rp)
 Minister of Trade of the Russian Federation (deleted decree of President of Russian Federation from September 26, 2000 ? 419-rp)
 Minister of Transport of the Russian Federation
 Minister of Finance of the Russian Federation
 Minister of Economy of the Russian Federation (Decree of the President ruled out the Russian Federation of 26 September 2000 ? 419-rp)
 Minister of Economic Development and Trade of the Russian Federation (including the disposition of the President of the Russian Federation of 26 September 2000 ? 419-rp)
 Minister of Energy of the Russian Federation (including the disposition of the President of the Russian Federation dated 26 September 2000 ? 419-rp)
 Minister of Justice of the Russian Federation
 Chairman of the State Committee of Russia (ruled out the order of the President of the Russian Federation dated 26 September 2000 ? 419-rp)
 Chairman of the State Committee of Russia (ruled out the order of the President of the Russian Federation dated 26 September 2000 ? 419-rp)
 Chairman of Russian State Standard
 Chairman of Russian State Construction Committee
 Chairman of Russian State Customs Committee
 Director of the SVR of Russia
 Head Roszemkadastra (including the disposition of the President of the Russian Federation dated 26 September 2000 ? 419-rp)
 Head Roscartography
 The head of Hydromet
 Russian FSB director
 Director of the Federal Tax Police Service of Russia (ruled by a presidential decree of November 25, 2003 ? 1389)
 Head of Russian Federal Security Service
 Director of Russian Federal Border Guard Service
 General Director of PAB (on order of the President of the Russian Federation from September 26, 2000 ? 419-rp)
 Director General of RACE
 Director General of Rosaviakosmos
 Director General of Munitions Agency
 The Director-General Rossudostroeniya
 The Director-General Rosrezerva
 The Director-General FAPSI
 Head GUSP
 Chairman of the State Technical Commission of Russia
 Head of Presidential Administration
 Chairman of the Bank of Russia
 Director of GFS Russia (including the order of the President of the Russian Federation dated 19 June 2001 ? 325-rp)
 CMTC chairman of Russia (including the disposition of the President of the Russian Federation on February 14, 2002 ? 64-p)
 Chairman of the Federal Drug Control Service of Russia (including a presidential decree of November 25, 2003 ? 1389)

Since 2005
Order of the President of the Russian Federation from April 16, 2005 № 151-rp approved list of officials of public authorities (in accordance with Presidential Decree of April 8, 2008 № 460 – government departments and organizations), confers the power to designate information a state secret:

 Head of Presidential Administration
 Deputy Prime Minister – Chief of Staff of the Russian Federation Government (including the disposition of the President of the Russian Federation from November 1, 2008 ? 654-rp)
 Deputy Prime Minister – Minister of Finance of the Russian Federation (including the disposition of the President of the Russian Federation from November 1, 2008 ? 654-rp)
 Minister of Internal Affairs of the Russian Federation
 Minister of the Russian Federation for Civil Defence, Emergencies and Elimination of Consequences of Natural Disasters
 Minister for Foreign Affairs of the Russian Federation
 Minister of Defence of the Russian Federation
 Minister of Justice of the Russian Federation
 Chief of Staff of the Russian Federation – Minister of Russian Federation (Decree of the President ruled out the Russian Federation from November 1, 2008 ? 654-rp)
 Minister for Health and Social Development of Russian Federation
 Minister of Education and Science of the Russian Federation
 Minister of Natural Resources of the Russian Federation in accordance with the decree of the President of the Russian Federation from November 1, 2008 ? 654-p "- Minister of Natural Resources and Environment of the Russian Federation
 Minister of Industry and Energy of the Russian Federation in accordance with the decree of the President of the Russian Federation from November 1, 2008 ? 654-p, - Minister of Industry and Trade of the Russian Federation
 Minister of Agriculture of the Russian Federation
 Minister of Transport of the Russian Federation
 Minister of Information Technologies and Communication of the Russian Federation in accordance with the decree of the President of the Russian Federation from November 1, 2008 ? 654-p "- Minister of Communications of the Russian Federation
 Minister of Finance of the Russian Federation (Decree of the President ruled out the Russian Federation from November 1, 2008 ? 654-rp)
 Minister of Economic Development and Trade of the Russian Federation in accordance with the decree of the President of the Russian Federation from November 1, 2008 ? 654-p "- Minister of Economic Development;
 Minister of Energy of the Russian Federation (including the disposition of the President of the Russian Federation from November 1, 2008 ? 654-rp)
 Minister for Regional Development of the Russian Federation (including the disposition of the President of the Russian Federation of 26 July 2008 ? 436-p)
 Chairman of the Bank of Russia
 Director of GFS Russia
 Director of the SVR of Russia
 Russian FSB director
 Director of Russian Federal Drug Control Service
 Director of Russian Federal Security Service
 Head GUSP
 The head of Hydromet (deleted order of the President of the Russian Federation from November 1, 2008 ? 654-rp)
 The head of Rosatom (deleted order of the President of the Russian Federation from November 1, 2008 ? 654-rp)
 Head of the agency
 Director FSTEK Russia
 Head of Federal Customs Service of Russia (including the disposition of the President of the Russian Federation on October 12, 2007 ? 570-rp)
 The Director-General of the State Atomic Energy Corporation Rosatom (includes Presidential Decree of April 8, 2008 ? 460)
 Director FSVTS Russia (including the order of the President of the Russian Federation on February 28, 2009 ? 124-rp)

Notes

References
 N. Stolyarov, "Organization of protection of state secrets in Russia" (Н. В. Столяров «Организация защиты государственной тайны в России»)
 Questions of a fair trial in criminal cases concerning espionage or divulging state secrets, the report of PACE, 2007 (Вопросы справедливого судебного разбирательства в уголовных делах о шпионаже или разглашении государственной тайны, доклад ПАСЕ, 2007)

Russia
Government of Russia
Law of Russia
Politics of Russia

ru:Государственная тайна